Mel Columcille Gerard Gibson  (born January 3, 1956) is an American actor and film director. He is best known for his action hero roles, particularly his breakout role as Max Rockatansky in the first three films of the post-apocalyptic action series Mad Max and as Martin Riggs in the buddy cop action-comedy film series Lethal Weapon.

Born in Peekskill, New York, Gibson moved with his parents to Sydney, Australia, when he was 12 years old. He studied acting at the National Institute of Dramatic Art, where he starred opposite Judy Davis in a production of Romeo and Juliet. During the 1980s, he founded Icon Entertainment, a production company, which independent film director Atom Egoyan has called "an alternative to the studio system". Director Peter Weir cast him as one of the leads in the World War I drama Gallipoli (1981), which earned Gibson a Best Actor Award from the Australian Film Institute, as well as a reputation as a serious, versatile actor.

In 1995, Gibson produced, directed, and starred in Braveheart, a historical epic, for which he won the Golden Globe Award for Best Director, the Academy Award for Best Director, and the Academy Award for Best Picture. He later directed and produced The Passion of the Christ, a biblical drama that was both financially successful and highly controversial. He received further critical notice for his directorial work of the action-adventure film Apocalypto (2006), which is set in Mesoamerica during the early 16th century.

After several legal issues and controversial statements leaked to the public, Gibson's public image plummeted significantly, affecting his careers in acting and directing. His career began seeing a resurgence with his performance in Edge of Darkness (2010) and Jodie Foster's The Beaver (2011). His directorial comeback after an absence of 10 years, Hacksaw Ridge (2016), won two Academy Awards and was nominated for another four including Best Picture and Best Director for Gibson, his second nomination in the category.

Early life 
Gibson was born in Peekskill, New York, of Irish descent, the sixth of 11 children, and the second son of Hutton Gibson, a writer, and Irish-born Anne Patricia (née Reilly, died 1990). Gibson's paternal grandmother was opera contralto Eva Mylott (1875–1920), who was born in Australia, to Irish parents, while his paternal grandfather, John Hutton Gibson, was a millionaire tobacco businessman from the American South. One of Gibson's younger brothers, Donal, is also an actor. Gibson's first name is derived from St Mel's Cathedral, situated in his mother's hometown of Longford. His second name, Colmcille, is also shared with an Irish saint. Because of his mother, Gibson retains dual Irish and American citizenship. Gibson is also an Australian permanent resident.

Gibson's father was awarded US$145,000 in a work-related-injury lawsuit against the New York Central Railroad on February 14, 1968, and soon afterwards relocated his family to West Pymble, Sydney, Australia. Gibson was 12 years old at the time. The move to his grandmother's native Australia was for economic reasons, and his father's expectation that the Australian Defence Forces would reject his eldest son for the draft during the Vietnam War.

During his high school years, Gibson was educated by members of the Congregation of Christian Brothers at St Leo's Catholic College in Wahroonga, New South Wales.

Career

Overview 
Gibson gained very favorable notices from film critics when he first entered the cinematic scene, as well as comparisons to several classic movie stars. In 1982, Vincent Canby wrote that "Mr. Gibson recalls the young Steve McQueen... I can't define 'star quality,' but whatever it is, Mr. Gibson has it." Gibson has also been likened to "a combination Clark Gable and Humphrey Bogart." Gibson's roles in the Mad Max series of films, Peter Weir's Gallipoli (1981), and the Lethal Weapon series of films earned him the label of "action hero".

Later, Gibson expanded into a variety of acting projects including human dramas such as the Franco Zeffirelli film version of Hamlet (1990), and comedic roles such as those in Maverick (1994) and What Women Want (2000). He expanded beyond acting into directing and producing, with: The Man Without a Face (1993), Braveheart (1995), The Passion of the Christ (2004), and Apocalypto (2006). Jess Cagle of Time compared Gibson with Cary Grant, Sean Connery, and Robert Redford. Connery once suggested Gibson should play the next James Bond to Connery's "M". Gibson turned down the role, reportedly because he feared being typecast.

Stage 
Gibson studied at the National Institute of Dramatic Art in Sydney. As students, Gibson and actress Judy Davis played the leads in Romeo and Juliet, and Gibson played the role of Queen Titania in an experimental production of A Midsummer Night's Dream. After graduation in 1977, Gibson immediately began work on the filming of Mad Max, but continued to work as a stage actor, and joined the State Theatre Company of South Australia in Adelaide. Gibson's theatrical credits include the character Estragon (opposite Geoffrey Rush) in Waiting for Godot, and the role of Biff Loman in a 1982 production of Death of a Salesman in Sydney. Gibson's most recent theatrical performance, opposite Sissy Spacek, was the 1993 production of Love Letters by A. R. Gurney, in Telluride, Colorado.

Australian television and cinema 

While a student at NIDA, Gibson made his film debut in the 1977 film Summer City, for which he was paid $400. Gibson then played the title character in the film Mad Max (1979). He was paid $15,000 for this role. Shortly after making the film he did a season with the South Australian Theatre Company. During this period he shared a $30 a week apartment in Adelaide with his future wife Robyn. After Mad Max, Gibson also played a mentally slow youth in the film Tim (also 1979). During this period Gibson also appeared in Australian television series guest roles. He appeared in serial The Sullivans as naval lieutenant Ray Henderson, in police procedural Cop Shop, and in the pilot episode of prison serial Punishment which was produced in 1980, screened 1981.

Gibson joined the cast of the World War II action film Attack Force Z, which was not released until 1982 when Gibson had become a bigger star. Director Peter Weir cast Gibson as one of the leads in the World War I drama Gallipoli (1981), which earned Gibson another Best Actor Award from the Australian Film Institute. Gallipoli also helped to earn Gibson the reputation of a serious, versatile actor and gained him the Hollywood agent Ed Limato. The sequel Mad Max 2 (1982) was his first hit in America, where it was released as The Road Warrior. Gibson again received positive notices for his role in Peter Weir's romantic thriller The Year of Living Dangerously (1982). Following a one-year hiatus from film acting after the birth of his twin sons, Gibson took on the role of Fletcher Christian in The Bounty (1984). Gibson earned his first million dollar salary for playing Max Rockatansky for the third time, in Mad Max Beyond Thunderdome (1985).

Hollywood 
Gibson's first American film was Mark Rydell's drama The River (1984), in which he and Sissy Spacek played struggling Tennessee farmers. Gibson then starred in the Gothic romance Mrs. Soffel (also 1984) for Australian director Gillian Armstrong. He and Matthew Modine played condemned convict brothers opposite Diane Keaton as the warden's wife who visits them to read the Bible. In 1985, after working on four films in a row, Gibson took almost two years off at his Australian cattle station. He returned to play the role of Martin Riggs in Lethal Weapon (1987), a film which helped to cement his status as a Hollywood "leading man". Gibson's next film was Robert Towne's Tequila Sunrise (1988), followed by Lethal Weapon 2 (1989). Gibson next starred in three films back-to-back, all released in 1990: Bird on a Wire, Air America, and Hamlet.

During the 1990s, Gibson alternated between commercial and personal projects. His films in the first half of the decade were Forever Young, Lethal Weapon 3, Maverick, and Braveheart. He then starred in Ransom, Conspiracy Theory, Lethal Weapon 4, and Payback. Gibson also served as the speaking and singing voice of John Smith in Disney's Pocahontas.

Gibson was paid a record salary of $25 million to appear in The Patriot (2000). It grossed over $100 million, as did two other films he featured in that year, Chicken Run and What Women Want. In 2002, Gibson appeared in the Vietnam War drama We Were Soldiers and M. Night Shyamalan's Signs, which became the highest-grossing film of Gibson's acting career. While promoting Signs, Gibson said that he no longer wanted to be a movie star and would only act in film again if the script were truly extraordinary. In 2010, Gibson appeared in Edge of Darkness, which marked his first starring role since 2002 and was an adaptation of the BBC miniseries, Edge of Darkness. In 2010, following an outburst at his ex-girlfriend that was made public, Gibson was dropped from the talent agency of William Morris Endeavor.

Gibson also played two villains: Luther Voz in Machete Kills in 2013, opposite Danny Trejo, and Conrad Stonebanks in The Expendables 3 opposite Sylvester Stallone in 2014.

Gibson appeared in the lead role of director S. Craig Zahler's police brutality-themed film Dragged Across Concrete, released in 2018. He then starred in The Professor and the Madman – he and the director both disowned the film.

Producer 

After his success in Hollywood with the Lethal Weapon series, Gibson began to move into producing and directing. With partner Bruce Davey, Gibson formed Icon Productions in 1989 in order to make Hamlet. In addition to producing or co-producing many of Gibson's own star vehicles, Icon has turned out many other small films, ranging from Immortal Beloved to An Ideal Husband. Gibson has taken supporting roles in some of these films, such as The Million Dollar Hotel and The Singing Detective. Gibson has also produced a number of projects for television, including a biopic on the Three Stooges and the 2008 PBS documentary Carrier. Icon has grown from being just a production company to also be an international distribution company and film exhibitor in Australia and New Zealand.

In June 2010, Gibson was in Brownsville, Texas, filming scenes for the film How I Spent My Summer Vacation, about a career criminal put in a tough prison in Mexico. In October 2010, it was reported that Gibson would have a small role in The Hangover Part II, but he was removed from the film after the cast and crew objected to his involvement.

Director 
Gibson has credited his directors, particularly George Miller, Peter Weir, and Richard Donner, with teaching him the craft of filmmaking and influencing him as a director. According to Robert Downey Jr., studio executives encouraged Gibson in 1989 to try directing, an idea he rebuffed at the time. Gibson made his directorial debut in 1993 with The Man Without a Face, followed two years later by Braveheart, which earned Gibson the Academy Award for Best Director. Gibson had long planned to direct a remake of Fahrenheit 451, but in 1999 the project was indefinitely postponed because of scheduling conflicts. Gibson was scheduled to direct Robert Downey Jr. in a Los Angeles stage production of Hamlet in January 2001, but Downey's drug relapse ended the project. In 2002, while promoting We Were Soldiers and Signs to the press, Gibson mentioned that he was planning to pare back on acting and return to directing. In September 2002, Gibson announced that he would direct a film called The Passion in Aramaic and Latin with no subtitles because he hoped to "transcend language barriers with filmic storytelling." In 2004, he released the controversial film The Passion of the Christ, with subtitles, which he co-wrote, co-produced, and directed. The film went on to become the highest-grossing rated R film at the time with $370,782,930 in U.S. box office sales. Gibson directed a few episodes of Complete Savages for the ABC network. In 2006, he directed the action-adventure film Apocalypto, his second film to feature sparse dialogue in a non-English language. In November 2016, film critic Matt Zoller Seitz named Gibson as "the pre-eminent religious filmmaker in the United States".

As a director, Gibson sometimes breaks the tension on set by having his actors perform serious scenes wearing a red clown nose. Helena Bonham Carter, who appeared alongside him in Hamlet, said of him, "He has a very basic sense of humor. It's a bit lavatorial and not very sophisticated." During the filming of Hamlet, Gibson would relieve pressure on the set by mooning the cast and crew, directly following a serious scene. Gibson inserted a single frame of himself smoking a cigarette into the 2005 teaser trailer of Apocalypto.

Future projects 

Gibson has expressed an intention to direct a movie set during the Viking Age, starring Leonardo DiCaprio. Like The Passion of the Christ and Apocalypto, he wants this speculative film to feature dialogue in period languages. However, DiCaprio ultimately opted out of the project. In a 2012 interview, Gibson announced that the project, which he has titled Berserker, was still moving forward.

In 2011, it was announced that Gibson had commissioned a screenplay from Joe Eszterhas about the Maccabees. The film is to be distributed by Warner Brothers Pictures. The announcement generated significant controversy. In April 2012, Eszterhas wrote a letter to Gibson accusing him of sabotaging their film about the Maccabees because he "hates Jews", and cited a series of private incidents during which he allegedly heard Gibson express extremely racist views. Although written as a private letter, it was subsequently published on a film industry website. In response, Gibson stated that he still intends to make the film, but will not base it upon Eszterhas's script, which he called substandard. Eszterhas then claimed his son had secretly recorded a number of Gibson's alleged "hateful rants". In a 2012 interview, Gibson explained that the Maccabees film was still in preparation. He explained that he was drawn to the Biblical account of the uprising due to its similarity to the American Old West genre.

In June 2016, Gibson announced that he will reunite with Braveheart screenwriter Randall Wallace to make a sequel for The Passion of the Christ, focusing on the resurrection of Jesus. In early November 2016, Gibson revealed on The Late Show with Stephen Colbert that the sequel's title will be The Passion of the Christ: Resurrection. He also stated that the project could "probably be three years off" because "it's a big subject". In January 2023, it was reported that the sequel will begin filming later that year.

In May 2018, it was announced that Gibson would be directing a WWII film titled Destroyer. Destroyer, similar to Hacksaw Ridge, will also deal with the Battle of Okinawa in the Pacific Theater, although from a different front. It will be based on the heroic story of the crew belonging to USS Laffey (DD-724), who defended their ship from 22 kamikaze attacks.

In September 2018, it was announced that Gibson would direct and co-write a remake of the 1969 film, The Wild Bunch. In May 2019, Deadline reported that Gibson was courting Michael Fassbender, Jamie Foxx, and Peter Dinklage to star in the project; that Jerry Bruckheimer will produce the film, and Warner Bros. will finance and release the project.

As of 2019, Gibson's cancelled projects included a Richard Donner–helmed film with the working title Sam and George.

After the death of Lethal Weapon director Richard Donner, Gibson has stated that he will direct, and also star, in a Lethal Weapon 5.

Film work 

Gibson's screen acting career began in 1976, with a role on the Australian television series The Sullivans. In his career, Gibson has appeared in 43 films, including the Mad Max and Lethal Weapon film series. In addition to acting, Gibson has also directed four films, including Braveheart and The Passion of the Christ; produced 11 films; and written two films. Films either starring or directed by Mel Gibson have earned over US$2.5 billion, in the United States alone. Gibson's filmography includes television series, feature films, television films, and animated films.

Mad Max series 

Gibson got his breakthrough role as the leather-clad post-apocalyptic survivor in George Miller's Mad Max. The independently financed blockbuster helped to make him an international star. In the United States, the actors' Australian accents were dubbed with American accents. The original film spawned two sequels: Mad Max 2 (known in North America as The Road Warrior) and Mad Max 3 (known in North America as Mad Max Beyond Thunderdome). A fourth movie, Mad Max: Fury Road (2015), was made with Tom Hardy in the title role.

Gallipoli 

The 1981 Peter Weir film Gallipoli is about a group of young men from rural Western Australia who enlist in the Australian Imperial Force during World War I. They are sent to invade the Ottoman Empire, where they take part in the 1915 Gallipoli campaign. During the course of the movie, the young men slowly lose their innocence about the war. The climax of the movie centers on the catastrophic Australian offensive known as the Battle of the Nek.

Peter Weir cast Gibson in the role of Frank Dunne, an Irish-Australian drifter with an intense cynicism about fighting for the British Empire. Newcomer Mark Lee was recruited to play the idealistic Archy Hamilton after participating in a photo session for the director. Gibson later recalled:

I'd auditioned for an earlier film and he told me right up front, "I'm not going to cast you for this part. You're not old enough. But thanks for coming in, I just wanted to meet you." He told me he wanted me for Gallipoli a couple of years later because I wasn't the archetypal Australian. He had Mark Lee, the angelic-looking, ideal Australian kid, and he wanted something of a modern sensibility. He thought the audience needed someone to relate to of their own time.

Gibson later said that Gallipoli is, "Not really a war movie. That's just the backdrop. It's really the story of two young men."

The critically acclaimed film helped to further launch Gibson's career. He won the award for Best Actor in a Leading Role from the Australian Film Institute.

The Year of Living Dangerously 

Gibson played a naïve but ambitious journalist opposite Sigourney Weaver and Linda Hunt in Peter Weir's atmospheric 1982 film The Year of Living Dangerously, based on the novel of the same name by Christopher Koch. The movie was both a critical and commercial success, and the upcoming Australian actor was heavily marketed by MGM studio. In his review of the film, Vincent Canby of The New York Times wrote, "If this film doesn't make an international star of Mr. Gibson, then nothing will. He possesses both the necessary talent and the screen presence." According to John Hiscock of The Daily Telegraph, the film did, indeed, establish Gibson as an international talent.

Gibson was initially reluctant to accept the role of Guy Hamilton. "I didn't necessarily see my role as a great challenge. My character was, like the film suggests, a puppet. And I went with that. It wasn't some star thing, even though they advertised it that way." Gibson saw some similarities between himself and the character of Guy. "He's not a silver-tongued devil. He's kind of immature and he has some rough edges and I guess you could say the same for me."

The Bounty 

Gibson followed the footsteps of Errol Flynn, Clark Gable, and Marlon Brando by starring as Fletcher Christian in a cinematic retelling of the Mutiny on the Bounty. The resulting 1984 film The Bounty is considered to be the most historically accurate version. However, Gibson has expressed a belief that the film's revisionism did not go far enough. He has stated that his character should have been portrayed as the film's antagonist. He has further praised Anthony Hopkins's performance as Lieutenant William Bligh as the best aspect of the film.

Lethal Weapon series 

Gibson moved into more mainstream commercial filmmaking with the popular action comedy film series Lethal Weapon, which began with the 1987 original. In the films he played LAPD Detective Martin Riggs, a recently widowed Vietnam veteran with a death wish and a penchant for violence and gunplay. In the films, he is partnered with a reserved family man named Roger Murtaugh (Danny Glover) and starting with the second film, they're joined by a hyperactive informant named Leo Getz (Joe Pesci). Following the success of Lethal Weapon, director Richard Donner and principal cast revisited the characters in three sequels, Lethal Weapon 2 (1989), Lethal Weapon 3 (1993), and Lethal Weapon 4 (1998). With its fourth installment, the Lethal Weapon series embodied "the quintessence of the buddy cop pic".

The film series has since been rebooted with a television adaptation, which aired for three seasons on FOX.

On November 15, 2021, Gibson confirmed that he will direct the fifth Lethal Weapon film following the death of director Richard Donner. "The man who directed all the 'Lethal films', Richard Donner, he was a big guy. He was developing the screenplay and he got pretty far along with it. And he said to me one day, 'Listen kid, if I kick the bucket you will do it.' And I said: 'Shut up.' But he did indeed pass away. But he did ask me to do it and at the time I didn't say anything. He said it to his wife and to the studio and the producer. So I will be directing the fifth one" Gibson said.

Hamlet 

Gibson made the unusual transition from action to classical drama, playing William Shakespeare's Danish prince in Franco Zeffirelli's Hamlet. Gibson was cast alongside experienced Shakespearean actors Ian Holm, Alan Bates, and Paul Scofield. He compared working with Scofield to being "thrown into the ring with Mike Tyson". Scofield said of Gibson "Not the sort of actor you'd think would make an ideal Hamlet, but he had enormous integrity and intelligence."

Braveheart 

In 1995, Gibson directed, produced, and starred in Braveheart, a biographical film of Sir William Wallace, a Scottish nationalist who was executed in 1305 for "high treason" against King Edward I of England. Gibson received two Academy Awards, Best Director and Best Picture, for his second directorial effort. In winning the Academy Award for Best Director, Gibson became only the sixth actor-turned-filmmaker to do so. Braveheart influenced the Scottish nationalist movement and helped to revive the film genre of the historical epic; the Battle of Stirling Bridge sequence is considered by critics to be one of the all-time best-directed battle scenes.

The film's depiction of the Prince of Wales as an effeminate homosexual caused the film to be attacked by the Gay Alliance. The Gay Alliance was especially enraged by a scene in which King Edward I murders his son's male lover by throwing him out of a castle window.

Gibson, who had previously been reported making several homophobic statements, now replied, "The fact that King Edward throws this character out a window has nothing to do with him being gay ... He's terrible to his son, to everybody."

Gibson asserted that the reason that King Edward I kills his son's lover is because the king is a "psychopath". Gibson also expressed bewilderment that some filmgoers laughed at this murder:

The Passion of the Christ 

Gibson directed, produced, co-wrote, and funded the film The Passion of the Christ (2004), which chronicled the passion and death of Jesus (Jim Caviezel). The film was shot exclusively in Aramaic, Latin, and Hebrew. Gibson originally intended to release the film without subtitles, but eventually relented for theatrical exhibition. The film sparked divergent reviews, ranging from high praise to criticism of the violence. The Anti-Defamation League accused Gibson of anti-semitism over the film's unflattering depiction of Caiaphas and the Sanhedrin.

In The Nation, reviewer Katha Pollitt wrote: "Gibson has violated just about every precept of the (United States Conference of Catholic Bishops) conference's own 1988 'Criteria' for the portrayal of Jews in dramatizations of the Passion (no bloodthirsty Jews, no rabble, no use of Scripture that reinforces negative stereotypes of Jews, etc.) ... The priests have big noses and gnarly faces, lumpish bodies, yellow teeth; Herod Antipas and his court are a bizarre collection of oily-haired, epicene perverts. The 'good Jews' look like Italian movie stars (Magdalene actually is an Italian movie star, the lovely Monica Bellucci); Mary, who would have been around 50 and appeared 70, could pass for a ripe 35."

Among those to defend Gibson were Orthodox Jewish rabbi Daniel Lapin and radio personality Michael Medved. Referring to ADL National Director Abraham Foxman, Rabbi Lapin said that by calling The Passion of the Christ anti-semitic, "what he is saying is that the only way (for Christians) to escape the wrath of Foxman is to repudiate (their own) faith."

In an interview with The Globe and Mail, Gibson stated: "If anyone has distorted Gospel passages to rationalize cruelty towards Jews or anyone, it's in defiance of repeated Papal condemnation. The Papacy has condemned racism in any form... Jesus died for the sins of all times, and I'll be the first on the line for culpability".

Eventually, the continued media attacks began to anger Gibson. After Hutton Gibson's Holocaust denial was used to attack his son's film in print by The New York Times writer Frank Rich, an enraged Mel Gibson retorted, "I want to kill him. I want his intestines on a stick.... I want to kill his dog."

Gibson's Traditionalist Catholic upbringing was also the target of criticism. In a 2006 interview with Diane Sawyer, Gibson stated that he feels that his "human rights were violated" by the often vitriolic attacks on his person, his family, and his religious beliefs which were sparked by The Passion.

The film grossed US$611,899,420 worldwide and $370,782,930 in the U.S. alone, surpassing any motion picture starring Gibson. In U.S. box offices, it became the seventh-highest-grossing (at the time) film in history and the highest-grossing R-rated film of all time. The film was nominated for three Academy Awards and won the People's Choice Award for Favorite Dramatic Motion Picture.

Apocalypto 

Gibson received further critical acclaim for his directing of the 2006 action-adventure film Apocalypto. Gibson's fourth directorial effort is set in Mesoamerica during the early 16th century against the turbulent end times of a Maya civilization. The sparse dialogue is spoken in the Yucatec Maya language by a cast of Native American descent.

Gibson himself has stated that the film is an attempt at making a deliberate point about great civilizations and what causes them to decline and disintegrate. Gibson said, "People think that modern man is so enlightened, but we're susceptible to the same forces—and we are also capable of the same heroism and transcendence." This theme is further explored by a quote from Will Durant, which is superimposed at the very beginning of the film: "A great civilization is not conquered from without until it has destroyed itself from within."

The Beaver 

Gibson starred in The Beaver, a domestic drama about a depressed alcoholic directed by former Maverick costar Jodie Foster. The Beaver premiered at the South by Southwest Festival in Austin, Texas on March 16, 2011. The opening weekend in 22 theaters was considered a flop; it made $104,000 which comes to a per-theater average of $4,745. The film's distributor, Summit Entertainment, had originally planned for a wide release of The Beaver for the weekend of May 20, but after the initial box-office returns for the film, the company changed course and decided instead to give the film a "limited art-house run". Michael Cieply of The New York Times observed on June 5, 2011, that the film had cleared just about $1 million, making it a certified "flop". Director Jodie Foster opined that the film did not do well with American audiences because it was a dramedy, and "very often Americans are not comfortable with [that]".

Before its release, much of the coverage focussed on the unavoidable association between the protagonist's issues and Mel Gibson's own well-publicized personal and legal problems (see ), including a conviction of battery of his ex-girlfriend. Wrote Time magazine, "The Beaver is a somber, sad domestic drama featuring an alcoholic in acute crisis ... It's hard to separate Gibson's true-life story from what's happening onscreen."

Hacksaw Ridge 

In 2014, Gibson signed on to direct Hacksaw Ridge, a World War II drama based on the true story of conscientious objector Desmond T. Doss, played by Andrew Garfield. The film premiered at the 73rd Venice Film Festival in September 2016 and received what The New Zealand Herald calls "rave reviews". It has won or been nominated for many awards, including Golden Globe nominations for Best Picture, Best Director for Gibson, and Best Actor for Garfield. Hacksaw Ridge was also nominated for an Academy Award for Best Picture, Best Director, Best Actor, Best Sound Editing, Best Sound Mixing, and Best Film Editing. The film grossed $164 million worldwide, four times its production costs.

Personal life

Relationships

Robyn Denise Moore 
Gibson met Robyn Denise Moore in the late 1970s, soon after filming Mad Max, in Adelaide, South Australia. At the time, Robyn was a dental nurse and Mel was an unknown actor working for the South Australian Theatre Company. On June 7, 1980, Mel and Robyn were married in a Catholic church in Forestville, New South Wales. They have one daughter, Hannah (b. 1980), and six sons: Edward (b. 1982), Christian (b. 1982), William (b. 1985), Louis (b. 1988), Milo (b. 1990), and Thomas (b. 1999); and three grandchildren .

After 26 years of marriage, Gibson and Robyn separated on July 29, 2006. In a 2011 interview, Gibson stated that the separation began the day following his arrest for drunk driving in Malibu. Robyn Gibson filed for divorce on April 13, 2009, citing irreconcilable differences. In a joint statement, the Gibsons declared, "Throughout our marriage and separation we have always striven to maintain the privacy and integrity of our family and will continue to do so." The divorce filing followed the March 2009 release of photographs appearing to show him on a beach embracing Russian songwriter and pianist Oksana Grigorieva.

Oksana Grigorieva 

In a 2010 interview, Grigorieva stated that, when she first began being wooed by Gibson, the actor-director and his wife had been separated for more than 18 months. Grigorieva added, “He wrote me a lot of poetry. It was very beautiful, impressionistic, like an edgy, modern iambic pentameter. Mel has a really good grasp of language, he’s fantastic with words."

Gibson's divorce was finalized on December 23, 2011, and the settlement with his ex-wife was said to be the highest in Hollywood history at over $400 million.  The couple reportedly did not have a prenuptial agreement; because California is a community property state, Robyn was entitled to half of everything earned during the marriage.

On April 28, 2009, Gibson made a red carpet-appearance with Grigorieva. Grigorieva, who had previously had a son with actor Timothy Dalton, gave birth to Gibson's daughter Lucia on October 30, 2009. By April 2010, Gibson and Grigorieva had split. On June 21, 2010, Grigorieva filed a restraining order against Gibson to keep him away from her and their child. The restraining order was modified the next day regarding Gibson's contact with their child. Gibson obtained a restraining order against Grigorieva on June 25, 2010.

Grigorieva accused Gibson of domestic violence, leading to an investigation by the Los Angeles County Sheriff's Department in July 2010. On July 9, 2010, some audio recordings of a rant, allegedly directed by Gibson toward Grigorieva, were posted on the internet. The same day Gibson was dropped by his agency, William Morris Endeavor. Gibson's estranged wife Robyn filed a court statement declaring that she never experienced any abuse from Gibson while forensic experts have questioned the validity of some of the tapes, Gibson himself did not deny they were accurate at the time. In March 2011, Mel Gibson agreed to plead no contest to a misdemeanor battery charge. In April 2011, Gibson finally broke his silence about the incident in question. In an interview with Deadline Hollywood, Gibson expressed gratitude to longtime friends Whoopi Goldberg and Jodie Foster, both of whom had spoken publicly in his defense. About the recordings, Gibson said,

In the same interview, Gibson stated

In August 2011, Gibson settled with Grigorieva, who was awarded $750,000, joint legal custody, and a house in Sherman Oaks, California until their daughter Lucia turns 18. In 2013, Grigorieva sued her attorneys, accusing them of advising her to sign a bad agreement, including a term that taking legal action against Gibson would compromise her financial settlement.

Rosalind Ross 
As of 2014, Gibson is in a relationship with former champion equestrian vaulter and writer Rosalind Ross. Ross gave birth to their son, and Gibson's ninth child, Lars Gerard, on January 20, 2017, in Los Angeles.

Investments 
Gibson is a property investor, with multiple properties in Malibu, California, several locations in Costa Rica, a private island in Fiji, and properties in Australia. In December 2004, Gibson sold his  Australian farm in the Kiewa Valley for $6 million. Also in December 2004, Gibson purchased Mago Island in Fiji from Tokyu Corporation of Japan for $15 million. Descendants of the original native inhabitants of Mago, who were displaced in the 1860s, have protested the purchase. Gibson stated it was his intention to retain the pristine environment of the undeveloped island.

In early 2005, he sold his  Montana ranch to a neighbor. In April 2007, he purchased a  ranch in Costa Rica for $26 million, and, in July 2007, he sold his  Tudor estate in Connecticut (which he purchased in 1994 for $9 million) for $40 million to an unnamed buyer. Also that month, he sold a Malibu property for $30 million that he had purchased for $24 million two years before.

In 2008, he purchased the Malibu home of actors David Duchovny and Téa Leoni.

Jersey Leaks 
Records of Gibson using offshore accounts and business were revealed in the Jersey Leaks, records of more than 20,000 individuals held with the wealth management firm Kleinwort Benson.

Philanthropy 

Gibson and his former wife have contributed a substantial amount of money to various charities, one of which is Healing the Children. According to Cris Embleton, one of the founders, the Gibsons gave millions to provide lifesaving medical treatment to needy children worldwide. They also supported the restoration of Renaissance artwork and gave millions of dollars to NIDA.

Gibson donated $500,000 to the El Mirador Basin Project to protect the last tract of virgin rain forest in Central America and to fund archeological excavations in the "cradle of Mayan civilization". In July 2007, Gibson again visited Central America to make arrangements for donations to the indigenous population. Gibson met with Costa Rican President Óscar Arias to discuss how to "channel the funds". During the same month, Gibson pledged to give financial assistance to a Malaysian company named Green Rubber Global for a tire recycling factory located in Gallup, New Mexico. While on a business trip to Singapore in September 2007, Gibson donated to a local charity for children with chronic and terminal illnesses. Gibson is also a supporter of Angels at Risk, a nonprofit organization focusing on education about drug and alcohol abuse among teens.

In a 2011 interview, Gibson said of his philanthropic works, "It gives you perspective. It's one of my faults, you tend to focus on yourself a lot. Which is not always the healthiest thing for your psyche or anything else. If you take a little time out to think about other people, it's good. It's uplifting."

Religious and political views

Faith 
Gibson was raised a sedevacantist traditionalist Catholic (who reject the sitting pope, and usually several prior ones as well). During the filming of The Passion of The Christ, he had daily visits from both local priests and priests from the Institute of Christ the King (a non-sedevacantist group) in France.

When asked about the Catholic doctrine of Extra Ecclesiam nulla salus, Gibson replied, "There is no salvation for those outside the Church ... I believe it. Put it this way. My wife is a saint. She's a much better person than I am. Honestly. She's ... Episcopalian, Church of England. She prays, she believes in God, she knows Jesus, she believes in that stuff. And it's just not fair if she doesn't make it, she's better than I am. But that is a pronouncement from the chair. I go with it." When he was asked whether John 14:6 is an intolerant position, he said that "through the merits of Jesus' sacrifice ... even people who don't know Jesus are able to be saved, but through him."

Gibson's acquaintance Fr. William Fulco said in 2009 that Gibson denies neither the pope nor Vatican II; even so, as of 2021, Gibson attended the Church of the Holy Family, a traditionalist church he founded and funds in Southern California. Gibson has told Diane Sawyer that he believes non-Catholics and non-Christians can go to Heaven.

In a 1990 interview with Barbara Walters, Gibson said: "God is the only one who knows how many children we should have, and we should be ready to accept them. One can't decide for oneself who comes into this world and who doesn't. That decision doesn't belong to us."

Politics 
Gibson has been described as "ultraconservative".

In a July 1995 interview with Playboy, Gibson said President Bill Clinton was a "low-level opportunist" and someone was "telling him what to do". He said that the Rhodes Scholarship was established for young men and women who want to strive for a "new world order" and this was a campaign for Marxism. Gibson later backed away from such conspiracy theories saying, "It was like: 'Hey, tell us a conspiracy'... so I laid out this thing, and suddenly, it was like I was talking the gospel truth, espousing all this political shit like I believed in it." In the same 1995 Playboy interview, Gibson argued against ordaining women to the priesthood.

In 2004, he publicly spoke out against taxpayer-funded embryonic stem-cell research that involves the cloning and destruction of human embryos. In March 2005, he condemned the outcome of the Terri Schiavo case, referring to Schiavo's death as "state-sanctioned murder".

Gibson questioned the Iraq War in March 2004. In 2006, Gibson said that the "fearmongering" depicted in his film Apocalypto "reminds me a little of President Bush and his guys." He later said in 2016 that he is anti-war but has an appreciation for the sacrifices made by "warriors".

Gibson complimented filmmaker Michael Moore and his documentary Fahrenheit 9/11 when he and Moore were recognized at the 2005 People's Choice Awards. Gibson's Icon Productions originally agreed to finance Moore's film, but later sold the rights to Miramax Films. Moore said that his agent Ari Emanuel claimed that "top Republicans" called Mel Gibson to tell him, "don't expect to get more invitations to the White House". Icon's spokesman dismissed this story, saying "We never run from a controversy. You'd have to be out of your mind to think that of the company that just put out The Passion of the Christ."

In a 2011 interview, Gibson stated:

The whole notion of politics is they always present you with this or this or this. I'll get a newspaper to read between the lines. Why do you have to adhere to prescribed formulas that they have and people argue over them and they're all in a box. And you watch Fox claw CNN, and CNN claw Fox. Sometimes I catch a piece of the news and it seems insanity to me. I quietly support candidates. I'm not out there banging a drum for candidates. But I have supported a candidate and it's a whole other world. Once you've been exposed to it, once or twice or however many times, if you know the facts and see how they're presented, it's mind-boggling. It's a very scary arena to be in, but I do vote. I go in there and pull the lever. It's kind of like pulling the lever and watching the trap door fall out from beneath you. Why should we trust any of these people? None of them ever deliver on anything. It's always disappointing.

Gibson revealed in a 2016 interview with Jorge Ramos that he voted for neither Donald Trump nor Hillary Clinton in the 2016 United States presidential election. In July 2021, Gibson was filmed saluting Trump while attending UFC 264, which went viral over the Internet.

In October 2020, Gibson released a statement regarding the 2020 Nagorno-Karabakh conflict and expressing solidarity with the Armenian people.

Alcohol abuse and legal issues 
Gibson has said that he started drinking at the age of 13. In a 2002 interview about his time at NIDA, Gibson said, "I had really good highs but some very low lows. I found out recently I'm manic depressive."

Gibson was banned from driving in Ontario, Canada, for three months in 1984, after rear-ending a car in Toronto while under the influence of alcohol. He retreated to his Australian farm for over a year to recover, but he continued to struggle with drinking. Despite this problem, Gibson gained a reputation in Hollywood for professionalism and punctuality such that frequent collaborator Richard Donner was shocked when Gibson confided that he was drinking five pints of beer for breakfast. Reflecting in 2003 and 2004, Gibson said that despair in his mid-30s led him to contemplate suicide, and he meditated on Christ's Passion to heal his wounds. He took more time off acting in 1991 and sought professional help. That year, Gibson's attorneys were unsuccessful at blocking the Sunday Mirror from publishing what Gibson shared at AA meetings. In 1992, Gibson provided financial support to Hollywood's Recovery Center, saying, "Alcoholism is something that runs in my family. It's something that's close to me. People do come back from it, and it's a miracle."

On August 17, 2006, Gibson pleaded no contest to a misdemeanor drunken-driving charge and was sentenced to three years' probation. He was ordered to attend self-help meetings five times a week for four-and-a-half months and three times a week for the remainder of the first year of his probation. He was also ordered to attend a First Offenders Program and fined $1,300, and his license was restricted for 90 days.

Controversies 

The Gay & Lesbian Alliance Against Defamation (GLAAD) accused Gibson of homophobia after a December 1991 interview in the Spanish newspaper El País in which he made derogatory comments about homosexuals. Gibson later defended his comments and rejected calls to apologize even as he faced fresh accusations of homophobia in the wake of his film Braveheart. However, Gibson joined GLAAD in hosting 10 lesbian and gay filmmakers for an on-location seminar on the set of the movie Conspiracy Theory in January 1997. In 1999, when asked about the comments to El País, Gibson said, "I shouldn't have said it, but I was tickling a bit of vodka during that interview, and the quote came back to bite me on the ass."

On July 28, 2006, Gibson was arrested by Sheriff's Deputy James Mee of the Los Angeles County Sheriff's Department for driving under the influence (DUI) while speeding in his vehicle with an open container of alcohol. According to a 2011 article in Vanity Fair, Gibson first told the arresting officer, "My life is over. I'm fucked. Robyn's going to leave me." According to the arrest report, Gibson exploded into an angry tirade when the arresting officer would not allow him to drive home. In what Vanity Fair was later told was an attempt to commit suicide by cop, Gibson said to the arresting officer, "Fucking Jews... the Jews are responsible for all the wars in the world. Are you a Jew?"

After the arrest report was leaked on TMZ.com, Gibson issued two apologies through his publicist, and—in a televised interview with Diane Sawyer—he affirmed the accuracy of the quotations. He further apologized for his "despicable" behavior, saying that the comments were "blurted out in a moment of insanity", and asked to meet with Jewish leaders to help him "discern the appropriate path for healing." After Gibson's arrest, his publicist said he had entered a recovery program to battle alcoholism.

In July 2010, Gibson had been recorded during a phone call with Oksana Grigorieva suggesting that if she got "raped by a pack of niggers", she would be to blame. Grigorieva said the voices on the multiple recordings leaked were of herself and Gibson, according to CNN. He was barred from coming near Grigorieva or their daughter due to a domestic violence-related restraining order. The Los Angeles County Sheriff's Department launched a domestic violence investigation against Gibson, later dropped when Gibson pleaded no contest to a misdemeanor battery charge.

Gibson's controversial statements resulted in him being blacklisted in Hollywood for almost a decade. Both Robert Downey Jr. and journalist Allison Hope Weiner advocated for forgiveness for Gibson in 2014. In 2016, Gibson's film Hacksaw Ridge, which received six Academy Award nominations, resulted in what was perceived as a "thaw" in his reputation and both actors and agencies immediately became eager to work with Gibson again.

Filmography

Awards and honors 

In 1985, Gibson was named the "Sexiest Man Alive" by People, the first person to be named so. Gibson quietly declined the Chevalier des Arts et Lettres from the French government in 1995 as a protest against France's resumption of nuclear testing in the Southwest Pacific. On July 25, 1997, Gibson was named an honorary Officer of the Order of Australia (AO), in recognition of his "service to the Australian film industry". The award was honorary because substantive awards are made only to Australian citizens.

 Australian Film Institute Award: Best Actor in a Lead Role, for Tim (1979) and Gallipoli (1981)
 Academy Award: Best Picture, for Braveheart (1995)
 Academy Award: Best Director, for Braveheart (1995)
 People's Choice Awards: Favorite Motion Picture Actor (1991, 1997, 2001, 2003, 2004)
 People's Choice Awards: Favorite Motion Picture Star in a Comedy (2001)
 ShoWest Award: Male Star of the Year (1993)
 ShoWest Award: Director of the Year (1996)
 American Cinematheque Gala Tribute: American Cinematheque Award (1995)
 Hasty Pudding Theatricals: Man of the Year (1997)
 Australian Film Institute: Global Achievement Award (2002)
 Honorary Doctorate Recipient and Undergraduate Commencement Speaker, Loyola Marymount University (2003)
 World's most powerful celebrity by U.S. business magazine Forbes (2004)
 The Hollywood Reporter Innovator of the Year (2004)
 Honorary fellowship in Performing Arts by Limkokwing University (2007)
 Outstanding Contribution to World Cinema Award at the Irish Film and Television Awards (2008)
 AACTA Awards, Best Film, for Hacksaw Ridge (2016)
 AACTA Awards, Best Direction, for Hacksaw Ridge (2016)
 Hollywood Film Awards, Hollywood Director Award, for Hacksaw Ridge (2016)
 Golden Raspberry Award for Worst Supporting Actor for Daddy's Home 2

Nominations 
 Saturn Award for Best Actor for Mad Max 2 (1981)
 Australian Film Institute Award for Best Actor in a Leading Role for The Year of Living Dangerously (1982)
 MTV Movie Award for Best Kiss (with Rene Russo) and Most Desirable Male for Lethal Weapon 3 (1992)
 BAFTA Award for Best Direction, Directors Guild of America Award, MTV Movie Award for Best Performance – Male, and MTV Movie Award for Most Desirable Male for Braveheart (1995)
 Golden Globe Award for Best Actor – Motion Picture Drama for Ransom (1996)
 MTV Movie Award for Best Action Sequence (with Danny Glover) for Lethal Weapon 4 (1998)
 Golden Globe Award for Best Actor – Motion Picture Musical or Comedy for What Women Want (2000)
 MTV Movie Award for Best Performance – Male for The Patriot (2000)
 Satellite Award for Best Director for The Passion of the Christ (2004)
 BAFTA Award for Best Film Not in the English Language and Golden Globe Award for Best Foreign Language Film for Apocalypto (2006)
 Golden Raspberry Award for Worst Supporting Actor for The Expendables 3 (2014)
 Golden Raspberry Award for Worst Supporting Actor for Dangerous (2021)

Citations

General bibliography

Further reading

External links 

 
 
 Mel Gibson on Biography
 Mel Gibson at AllMovie
 
 
 
 
 Mel Gibson interviewed by Roy Faires at KVUE in Austin discussing his new movie Lethal Weapon (1987) from Texas Archive of the Moving Image

 
1956 births
Living people
20th-century American male actors
20th-century Roman Catholics
21st-century American male actors
21st-century American male writers
21st-century Roman Catholics
American emigrants to Australia
American male film actors
American male screenwriters
American male Shakespearean actors
American male stage actors
American male television actors
American people of Australian descent
American people of Irish descent
American traditionalist Catholics
American writers of Irish descent
Best Actor AACTA Award winners
Best Directing Academy Award winners
Best Director AACTA International Award winners
Best Director Golden Globe winners
Film directors from New York (state)
Formalist poets
Male actors from New York (state)
Male actors from Sydney
National Institute of Dramatic Art alumni
Officers of the Order of Australia
People convicted of battery
People from Peekskill, New York
Philanthropists from New York (state)
Producers who won the Best Picture Academy Award
Screenwriters from New York (state)
Television producers from New York (state)
LGBT-related controversies in film
Religious controversies in film
Mel